George Harold Christian Church  was Archdeacon of Malta from 1971 to 1975. Church was educated at the London College of Divinity; and ordained in 1938. After a curacy in Ware a he was a RAF Chaplain from 1939 to 1965.

References

Alumni of the London College of Divinity
Archdeacons of Malta
20th-century Maltese Anglican priests
Royal Air Force chaplains
Commanders of the Order of the British Empire